Rangsit is a city in Pathum Thani Province, Thailand.

Rangsit may also refer to:

 Khlong Rangsit, a canal north of Bangkok
 Rangsit, Prince of Chainat (1885–1951), Thai prince
 Rangsit University, a university in Pathum Thani Province, Thailand